Alejandra Ortega (born 8 July 1994 in Mexico City) is a female racewalker from Mexico. She competed in the Women's 20 kilometres walk event at the 2015 World Championships in Athletics in Beijing, China, where she finished 9th and at the 2015 Pan American Games where she finished 8th.  She competed in the 2016 Olympics, finishing 41st.

She was the gold medalist in the junior race at the 2013 Pan American Race Walking Cup, vanquishing her closest competitor by more than two minutes.  The previous year she was the silver medalist at the 2012 IAAF World Race Walking Cup, where she set the North American Junior Record at 46:00.  She was also champion at the 2012 Central American and Caribbean Junior Championships in Athletics.

See also
 Mexico at the 2015 World Championships in Athletics

References

External links
 

1994 births
Living people
Mexican female racewalkers
Olympic athletes of Mexico
Athletes (track and field) at the 2016 Summer Olympics
Athletes (track and field) at the 2015 Pan American Games
20th-century Mexican women
21st-century Mexican women